Aditi Rathore  is an Indian television actress. She is best known for essaying the role of Avni Khanna in Star Plus's Naamkarann.

Early life 
Rathore was born on 30 October 1993, in Jaipur into a Marwari family. She grew up in Bikaner, Rajasthan. She did her schooling in Bikaner after which she moved to Mumbai to pursue a career in acting.

Career 
Rathore made her debut in Zee TV's Kumkum Bhagya as Rachna Mehra, wife of Akash Ajay Mehra. She then played the character of Preeti Tiwari in the soap opera Ek Duje Ki Vaaste, aired mainly on the channel Sony TV.

From 2017 to 2018, Rathore played Avni in the Star Plus daily soap opera Naamkarann. She entered the show after a 15-year leap, replacing Arsheen Naamdaar.

In 2021, she joined Star Plus show Aapki Nazron Ne Samjha as negative lead Dr. Charmi.

In the media
Aditi Rathore was ranked 23rd in Eastern Eyes Sexiest Asian women List 2018 and 12th in Biz Asia's TV Personality List 2018.

Filmography

Television

Awards and nominations

See also 
List of Indian television actresses
List of Hindi television actresses

References

External links
 

Living people
Rajasthani people
21st-century Indian actresses
1993 births